Lois is a common English name from the New Testament. Paul the Apostle mentions Lois, the pious grandmother of Saint Timothy in the Second Epistle to Timothy (commending her for her faith in 2 Timothy 1:5). The name was first used by English Christians after the Protestant Reformation, and it was popular, particularly in North America, during the first half of the 20th century.

Notable women
 Lois Bryan Adams (1817-1870), American writer, journalist, newspaper editor
 Lois McMaster Bujold, author
 Lois Capps, congresswoman
 Lois Chiles, actress
 Lois Collier, actress
 Lois Ehlert, writer
 Lois Hole, lieutenant governor of Alberta (2000–2005)
 Lois Johnson (1942–2014), American country music singer
 Lois Kolkhorst, American politician
 Lois M. Leveen, author
 Lois Lilienstein, singer
 Lois Long, writer for The New Yorker
 Lois Lowry, author
 Lois Maffeo (Lois), musician
 Lois Maxwell, actress
 Lois McCallin, athlete
 Lois McConnell, lead singer of European EDM group N-Force
 Lois McIvor (1930–2017), New Zealand painter
 Lois Meredith, actress
 Lois Miriam Wilson, minister
 Lois Moran, actress
 Lois Roberts, murder victim
 Lois Roisman, activist/playwright/poet
 Lois Smith, actress
 Lois Wilde, actress
 Lois Wilson, American silent film actress 
 Lois V. Vierk, composer
 Lois Lenski, Newberry award-winning children’s books author/illustrator

Fictional women
Lois Flagston (née Bailey), the comic strip Hi and Lois.
Lois Griffin (née Pewterschmidt), the animated series Family Guy.
 Lois Habiba, the TV series Torchwood: Children of Earth.
Lois Lane, the Daily Planet reporter in DC Comics.
Lois the Blue Footed Booby, a character on Bear in the Big Blue House.
Lois Lane, who plays Bianca in the play within the play Kiss Me, Kate.
Lois Morgan, the TV series Ellen.
Lois Wilkerson, the TV series Malcolm in the Middle.

As male name
In French, Loïs is a male name, as in the fictional comic strip adventures of Loïs Lorcey by Jacques Martin.

The name Loïs is derived from the name Louis, itself derived from Clovis which is derived from the Germanic root, Hlodowig, which can be interpreted in the sense of "glorious" or "illustrious fighter". Close names include Louys, Luis, Louis, Lorys, Lucio, Leonus, Louniss, Lyes, Clovis, Ludovic, Ludwig, Lovis, and Luigi.

See also 
 Lois, Missouri, a community in the United States
 Loïs Lane, a Dutch girl group
 Louise, given name
 Loyce

English feminine given names
Given names of Greek language origin